Dragu is a commune located in Sălaj County, Transylvania, Romania. It is composed of five villages: Adalin (Adalin), Dragu, Fântânele (Kabalapatak), Ugruțiu (Ugróc) and Voivodeni (Vajdaháza).

Sights  
 Wooden Church in Dragu, built in the 19th century (1806), historic monument 
 Wooden Church in Adalin, built in the 18th century (1787)
 Wooden Church in Voivodeni, built in the 19th century (1822), historic monument
 Wesselényi-Bethlen Castle in Dragu, built in the 18th century, historic monument

References

Communes in Sălaj County
Localities in Transylvania